The 2019 Chinese Women's Super League season was the league's 5th season in its current incarnation, and the 23rd total season of the women's association football league in China.

The season started on 13 July and concluded on 22 September.

Dalian were the defending champions but ended the season bottom of the league.

Jiangsu Suning won the title, their second since 2009.

Clubs

Club changes

From League One
Teams promoted from 2018 Chinese Women's Football League
Meizhou Huijun

To League One
Teams relegated to 2019 Chinese Women's Football League
Hebei China Fortune

Name Changes
 Shanghai W.F.C. changed their name to Shanghai Shengli F.C. in January 2019.
 Dalian Quanjian F.C. changed their name to Dalian W.F.C.

Stadiums and Locations

Foreign players

League table

Fixtures and results

Round 1

Round 2

Round 3

Round 4

Round 5

Round 6

Round 7

Round 8

Round 9

Round 10

Relegation play-offs

Top scorers

Notes

References

External links
Season

2019
2018–19 domestic women's association football leagues
2019–20 domestic women's association football leagues
+